The Heathrow Cargo Tunnel is a road tunnel in the London Borough of Hillingdon, London, UK that serves London Heathrow Airport.

History
In December 1968, the tunnel first opened, to connect Terminals 1, 2 and 3 to the newly opened cargo terminal at Heathrow, and it cost £2 million to build. The tunnel is not open to the public; it is used only by vehicles with security clearance to drive airside. It is used for cargo movements, and transfer of passengers to and from Terminal 4 (In 1986, Terminal 4 was built next to the cargo terminal). From 1972, a London Transport bus service (route 82) operated through the tunnel. In 1986, when Terminal 4 opened, a number of other bus routes then also passed through the tunnel. This was an unusual situation, because anyone could board the bus, and travel "airside" without going through any security checks. In 1989, in the interests of security, all public bus services were withdrawn from the tunnel. All public buses now enter the central area through the main tunnel.

Design and construction
The cargo tunnel is bi-directional; it has one bore, carrying one lane in each direction.

The segments are expanded directly against the ground, which is London Clay. The bored section of the cargo tunnel is notable among tunnelling engineers, for having been constructed with a remarkably thin cover of solid clay above it (minimum cover  clay beneath the Terrace gravels).

The tunnel is one of the few in the United Kingdom that is ventilated by a fully transverse system – it has an air supply duct in the invert of the tunnel, and an air extract duct in the crown of the tunnel. Extraction and supply fans are sited in underground chambers at the north end and the south end of the tunnel, at the Tunnel Boring Machine (TBM) launch and retrieval chambers.

Consulting Engineer for the works was Sir William Halcrow and Partners, with Hoare Lea & Partners advising on electrical and mechanical services. The tunnel was built by Taylor Woodrow Construction, with E&M fitout by Halliday Hall and Aerex.

The cargo tunnel was the only privately operated road tunnel in the United Kingdom until March 2005, when the Heathrow Airside Road Tunnel was opened to airside traffic next to it.

Notes

Bibliography
 Above Us The Skies: The Story of BAA – 1991 (Michael Donne – BAA plc), p. 15
 Muir Wood, A. M. & Gibb, F. R., Design and Construction of the cargo tunnel at Heathrow Airport, London, Paper 7357, Proc. Instn. Civ. Engnrs., Vol 48, 1971
 "Discussion of paper 7357", Proc. Instn. Civ. Engnrs., Vol 48, 1971

External links
 
 Photo Cargo Tunnel entrance 1973
 Photo Egyptair Il-18 from  public no. 82 LT bus entering cargo tunnel airside 1972

Cargo Tunnel
Road tunnels in England
Transport in the London Borough of Hillingdon
Tunnels completed in 1968
Tunnels in London
1968 establishments in England
Cargo Tunnel